Stramaccioni is an Italian surname. Notable people with the surname include:

Andrea Stramaccioni (born 1976), Italian association football manager
Diego Stramaccioni (born 2001), Italian association football defender

Surnames of Italian origin